Charles Townsend may refer to:

 Charlie Townsend (1876–1958), Gloucestershire cricketer
 Charles Champlain Townsend (1841–1910), U.S. Representative from Pennsylvania
 Charles E. Townsend (1856–1924), U.S. Representative Senator from Michigan
 Charles Harrison Townsend (1851–1928), English architect
 Charles Haskins Townsend (1859–1944), American zoologist
 Charles Henry Tyler Townsend (1863–1944), American Entomologist
 Charles Townsend (BMX rider) (born 1967), American former professional BMX racer
 Charles Townsend (fencer) (1872–1906), American fencer and Olympic silver medalist
 Charles Townsend (Ohio politician) (1834–1900), Republican politician in Ohio
 Charles Townsend (British politician), British politician of the 1890s
 Charles H. Townsend, president and CEO of the Condé Nast publishing company
 Charles Townsend,  community-college instructor, see 
 Charles Townsend (Wyoming politician), Wyoming state senator
 Charles "Charlie" Townsend, fictional unseen character on the Charlie's Angels television and motion picture series

See also

Charles Townshend (disambiguation)